David Lane "Buddy" Tynes (February 26, 1902November 28, 1984) was an American football player.  He played college football for Texas and two seasons in the National Football League (NFL) as a fullback and halfback for the Columbus Tigers in 1924 and 1925. He was selected as a second-team halfback on the 1925 All-Pro Team.

References

1902 births
1984 deaths
People from Cooper, Texas
Players of American football from Texas
American football fullbacks
American football halfbacks
Texas Longhorns football players
Columbus Tigers players